Propebela mitrata is a species of sea snail, a marine gastropod mollusk in the family Conidae, the cone snails and their allies.

Description
The length of the shell attains 24 mm, its diameter 11 mm.

(Original description) The shell resembles Obesotoma tenuilirata cimata, but with a sharper sculpture, higher spire, a shorter aperture, a more gyrate columella, and a darker color, especially on the keel at the shoulder.

Distribution
The Propebela mitrata is typically found in the Eastern Pacific Ocean in the Sea of Japan and from Port Clarence, Bering Strait, to the Shumagin Islands, Alaska.

References

External links
 
 

mitrata
Gastropods described in 1919